The Richfield Carnegie Library in Richfield, Utah is a building from 1913. It was listed on the National Register of Historic Places in 1984.

See also

 National Register of Historic Places listings in Sevier County, Utah

References

Library buildings completed in 1913
Libraries on the National Register of Historic Places in Utah
Buildings and structures in Sevier County, Utah
Carnegie libraries in Utah
Education in Sevier County, Utah
1913 establishments in Utah
National Register of Historic Places in Sevier County, Utah